Portugal is a European Parliament constituency for elections in the European Union covering the member state of Portugal. It is currently represented by twenty-one Members of the European Parliament.

Current Members of the European Parliament

Elections

1987

The first European election in Portugal was a by-election held after it joined the European Communities in 1987. The rest of the EC had voted in the 1984 European election.

1989

The 1989 European election was the third election to the European Parliament and the first time Portugal voted with the rest of the Community.

1994

The 1994 European election was the fourth election to the European Parliament and the third for Portugal.

1999

The 1999 European election was the fifth election to the European Parliament and the fourth for Portugal.

2004

The 2004 European election was the sixth election to the European Parliament and the fifth for Portugal.

2009

The 2009 European election was the seventh election to the European Parliament and the sixth for Portugal.

2014

The 2014 European election was the eighth election to the European Parliament and the seventh for Portugal.

2019

The 2019 European election was the ninth election to the European Parliament and the eighth for Portugal.

References

External links
 European Election News by European Election Law Association (Eurela)
 List of MEPs europarl.europa.eu

European Parliament elections in Portugal
European Parliament constituencies
1987 establishments in Portugal
Constituencies established in 1987